Joaquín Barceló (1893 – no death date found) was a Cuban pitcher who played in the Negro leagues in the 1920s.

A native of Caibarién, Cuba, Barceló played for the All Cubans in 1921. In two recorded games on the mound, he posted an 8.76 ERA over 12.1 innings.

References

External links
Baseball statistics and player information from Baseball-Reference Black Baseball Stats and Seamheads

Date of birth missing
Year of death missing
Place of death missing
All Cubans players
1893 births
Baseball pitchers
Cuban baseball players
People from Caibarién